State Road 70 in the U.S. state of Indiana consists of two discontinuous east–west segments of two-lane rural roadway.  State Road 70 passes through no cities or towns of significant size.

Route description

Western segment

Eastern segment

Major intersections

References

External links

 Indiana Highway Ends - SR 70

070
Transportation in Spencer County, Indiana
Transportation in Perry County, Indiana